Nialler9 is an Irish music blog founded in 2005 by DJ and designer Niall Byrne. The company is headquartered in Dublin, Ireland. It has been referred to as "the grandaddy of Irish music blogs" by the Sunday Times.

History 

Founder Niall Byrne started the website as a portfolio after finishing a course in multimedia design from the Dún Laoghaire Institute of Art, Design and Technology. The site is a four-time winner at the Irish Blog Awards, in the category of 'Best music blog'. Byrne also hosted a radio show under the Nialler9 name on TXFM before the station's closure in 2016. Byrne has been on the judging panel for the Choice Music Prize.

References

Internet properties established in 2005
Magazines established in 2005
Music blogs
Music magazines
Music review websites